This is a list of Chinese astronauts, sometimes called taikonauts. The list includes people trained by the China National Space Administration (CNSA) to command, pilot, or serve as a crew member of a spacecraft.

As the Chinese space program developed during the sixties, various proposals for crewed spacecraft were made. The first crewed spacecraft proposed by the People's Republic of China during the late 1960s and early 1970s was the Shuguang One which was expected to bring the first Chinese astronaut in 1973 into space. For this programme 19 astronauts were selected in 1971. However, shortly after these plans were made, several leading scientists attached to the project were denounced during the Cultural Revolution, bringing progress to a standstill. Instead, NASA astronaut Taylor Wang, a naturalized U.S. citizen born in China, became the first ethnically Chinese person in space in 1985.

The People's Liberation Army Astronaut Corps was established in 1998 for the selection of Shenzhou program astronauts. In 2003, Yang Liwei was launched aboard Shenzhou 5, becoming the first person sent into space by the Chinese space program. This achievement made China the third country to independently send humans into space. During the Shenzhou 7 mission in 2008, Zhai Zhigang became the first Chinese citizen to carry out a spacewalk. In 2012, Liu Yang became the first Chinese woman to be launched into space aboard Shenzhou 9 and also the first aboard a space station Tiangong-1. In 2021, Wang Yaping became the first Chinese woman to walk in space during the Shenzhou 13 mission.

, sixteen Chinese nationals have traveled in space.

Astronauts

Flown

By selection group

Shuguang Group (May 1970)

 Chai Hongliang
 Dong Xiaohai
 Du Jincheng
 Fang Guojun
 Hu Zhanzi
 Li Shichang
 Liu Chongfu
 Liu Zhongyi
 Lu Xiangxiao
 Ma Zizhong
 Meng Senlin
 Shao Zhijian
 Wang Fuhe
 Wang Fuquan
 Wang Quanbo
 Wang Rongsen
 Wang Zhiyue
 Yu Guilin
 Zhang Ruxiang

Group 1
October 1996

Li Qinglong (mission: backup commander Shenzhou 5; retired in 2014)
Wu Jie (mission: backup commander Shenzhou 6; retired in 2014)

January 1998

Chen Quan (mission: backup commander Shenzhou 7; retired in 2014)
 Deng Qingming (mission: Shenzhou 15; backup Shenzhou 9, Shenzhou 10, Shenzhou 11, Shenzhou 12)
 Fei Junlong (mission: commander Shenzhou 6, Shenzhou 15; backup Shenzhou 7)
 Jing Haipeng (missions: Shenzhou 7, commander Shenzhou 9, Shenzhou 11)
 Liu Boming (missions: Shenzhou 7, Shenzhou 12)
 Liu Wang (mission: Shenzhou 9)
 Nie Haisheng (missions: Shenzhou 6, Shenzhou 10, Shenzhou 12; backup Shenzhou 7, Shenzhou 9)
 Pan Zhanchun (retired in 2014)
 Yang Liwei (mission: commander Shenzhou 5)
 Zhai Zhigang (missions: Shenzhou 7, Shenzhou 13; backup Shenzhou 6)
 Zhang Xiaoguang (mission: backup Shenzhou 9; Shenzhou 10)
 Zhao Chuandong (retired in 2014)

Group 2 (March 2010) 

 Cai Xuzhe (mission: Shenzhou 14)
 Chen Dong (missions: Shenzhou 11, commander Shenzhou 14)
 Liu Yang (missions: Shenzhou 9, Shenzhou 14)
 Tang Hongbo (mission: Shenzhou 12)
 Wang Yaping (missions: Shenzhou 10, Shenzhou 13; backup Shenzhou 9)
 Ye Guangfu (mission: Shenzhou 13)
 Zhang Lu (mission: Shenzhou 15)

Group 3 (October 2020)
China announced that 18 people - 17 men, 1 woman, all of whose names were not revealed - had been selected as new astronauts. The positions were broken down as 7 spacecraft pilots ("aviators of the People's Liberation Army Air Force"), 7 flight engineers ("former researchers or technicians in aeronautics, astronautics and other related fields"), and 4 mission payload specialists ("those involved in space science and through applications for China's manned space program").

See also
 Chinese women in space
 Chinese American astronauts
 Taylor Wang
Franklin Chang-Díaz
 Leroy Chiao
 Ed Lu
 List of astronauts
 List of astronauts by selection
 Shuguang Group 1970 list
 China Group 1996 list
 Chinese Group 1 list

References

Chinese

Astronauts
Shenzhou program